Xiaojin County, also known as Tsanlha from its Tibetan name, is a county in the northwest of Sichuan Province, China. It is the southernmost county-level division of the Ngawa Tibetan and Qiang Autonomous Prefecture.

History
Prior to 18th century, the county was the land of the Tibetan Chiefdom of Tsanlha.

Administrative divisions
Xiaojin County contains five towns and 16 townships:

Meixing Town 美兴镇
Siguniangshan Town 四姑娘山镇 (formerly Rilong 日隆镇)
Dawei Town 达维镇
Wori Town 沃日镇
Lianghekou Town 两河镇
Laoying Township 老营乡
Chongde Township 崇德乡
Xinqiao Township 新桥乡
Meiwo Township 美沃乡
Shalong Township 沙龙乡
Zhailong Township 宅垄乡
Xinge Township 新格乡
Ri’er Township 日尔乡
Jiexin Township 结斯乡
Mupo Township 木坡乡
Fubian Township 抚边乡
Bajiao Township 八角乡
Shuangbai Township 双柏乡 
Wodi Township 窝底乡
Hanniu Township 汗牛乡
Pan’an Township 潘安乡

Climate

References

Ngawa Tibetan and Qiang Autonomous Prefecture
County-level divisions of Sichuan